ENC may refer to:

 Eastern Naval Command of the Indian Navy
 Eastern Nazarene College in Quincy, Massachusetts
 Eastern North Carolina
 Effective number of codons
 Electronic navigational chart
 En language
 ENC (company), a bus manufacturer previously known as ElDorado National–California
 ENC Press, an American publishing company
 Encapsulin
 Enfield Chase railway station, in London
 Equality North Carolina, an American LGBT advocacy group
 Escuela Nacional de Cine, a film school in Caracas, Venezuela
 European Nations' Cup (disambiguation)
 Nancy-Essey Airport, in France